Dimitrios Nikolaou (born 13 August 1998) is a Greek professional footballer who plays as a centre-back for Serie A club Spezia and the Greece national team.

Club career

Olympiacos
On 29 January 2017, Nikolaou made his debut with the club in a 2–1 away Super League win against Veria. A month later, he scored his first goal in a 2–0 Greek Cup win game against Aris.

On 18 October 2017, Nikolaou scored an own goal and headed goal for his team in a 3–1 away loss in the 2017–18 UEFA Champions League group stage against Barcelona.

Loan to Empoli
On 28 January 2019, the 20-year-old Dimitris Nikolaou departed Piraeus, signing for Serie A club Empoli on a loan for the remainder of the 2018–19 season, with a purchase option at the range of €3.5 million. This season, Nikolaou has largely been sitting on the sidelines with Olympiacos, only participating in one Greek Cup match. The young defender is regarded as a prospect for the future and will hope to receive regular playing time with Empoli. On 15 April 2019, he made his debut with the club in a 0–0 away draw game against Atalanta.

Empoli
On 2 June 2019, Empoli activate the option of the 20-year-old international defender who reportedly was worth €3.5 million. Nikolaou played in four games at Campionato, and the leaders of the Italian club decided to activate the option of the young Greek defender, besides their relegation. Nikolaou signed for four years for an undisclosed fee. The announcement from the Italian club stated: "Empoli announces that he has exercised the right to buy and signed with the young international Dimitris Nikolaou from Olympiacos."

Spezia
Since the end of 2020-21 season, it was obvious that Dimitris Nikolaou performance with the Empoli jersey, leading it to the Serie B title and the promotion to Serie A, would hardly keep the 23-year-old central defender in the Azzurri, especially since he was in the last year of his contract. His coach, Alessio Dionisi, wanted him in Sassuolo, since he became head coach at the beginning of the summer 2021, while at the same time, the technical director who brought him to Empoli, Riccardo Pecini, wanted him in his own new team Spezia Calcio, with which he will sign a five-year contract and will increase more than double his current earnings. 
On 13 August 2021, he scored his first goal with the club in a Coppa Italia away 3-1 win game against Pordenone Calcio.

Career statistics
As of 22 May 2022 (UTC)..

Honours

Club
Empoli
Serie B: 2020–21
Olympiacos
Super League Greece: 2016–17

References

External links

 
 
 

1998 births
Living people
Greek footballers
Greek expatriate footballers
Greece youth international footballers
Greece under-21 international footballers
Greece international footballers
Super League Greece players
Serie A players
Serie B players
Olympiacos F.C. players
Empoli F.C. players
Spezia Calcio players
Expatriate footballers in Italy
Association football defenders
Footballers from Chalcis